Sidney Percy Roberson (15 March 1937 – 22 December 2016), known as Sid Roberson, was a British bodybuilder, personal trainer, actor, director, photographer and advertising executive. He placed 3rd as Mr Universe in 1963; trained the gangster Reggie Kray; was the lead in a campaign for Strongbow cider; directed advertising for Hamlet cigars, the Labour Party and W. H. Smith; and directed television including The Sweeney and The Fast Show.

His daughter from his first marriage, Hannah Roberson-Mytilinaiou, represented Greece at showjumping in the 2004 Olympics.

References

External links 
 

1937 births
2016 deaths
Alumni of Birkbeck, University of London
English bodybuilders
English expatriates in the United States
English film directors
English television directors
People from Edmonton, London